Jenna Lyons (born June 8, 1968) is an American fashion designer and business personality. Lyons was the creative director and president for J.Crew from 2008 and 2010, respectively. In April 2017, her departure from J.Crew was announced after two years of declining sales. In 2013, Lyons had been referred to as the "Woman Who Dresses America". In 2017, The New York Times commented that "the face of the brand became the symbol of its fall."

Early life and education
Lyons was born Judith Lyons in Boston, Massachusetts. She moved to Palos Verdes, California when she was four. Here, she grew up being subjected to heavy bullying, due to her gawkiness and health problems. She suffered from incontinentia pigmenti, a genetic disorder which scarred her skin, caused her hair to fall out in patches, and caused her teeth to be malformed, which is the reason she wears dentures.

Much of Lyons' outlooks and interests stem from her childhood experiences. About her childhood, she states that her genetic condition "made me introverted, but it was also the reason I loved fashion, because it can change who you are and how you feel, and that can be magical." Her mother was a piano teacher who encouraged her to get involved creatively, leading to her interest in fashion. She loved to rebel against her school uniform, and she learned to sew in seventh grade, which granted her more confidence. One of her personal motivations for success stems from witnessing her parents' divorce and having to never rely on a man to get by. Due to her interest and talent for fashion, Lyons attended Parsons and graduated in 1990.

Career
Lyons landed her first job at J.Crew when she was 21. She began as an assistant designer in men's wear, and her first assignment was redesigning men's rugby shirts for the company. She began to work her way up, and by 2003 she was J.Crew's Vice President of Women's Design.

When former CEO and chairman Millard Drexler was hired in 2003, he and Lyons began to form a close relationship. The two were key players in helping J.Crew triple its revenue from just short of $690 million in 2003 to just shy of $2 billion in 2011. In 2008, Drexler appointed Lyons the executive creative director, and in 2010 he appointed her president as well. Lyons has said her holding both of these roles, "no financial decision weighs heavier than a creative decision. They are equal." In this role, Lyons oversaw the over one hundred designers of J.Crew and directed the layouts, designs, and looks for the J.Crew catalog, or as the company calls it, its Style Guide.

Lyons crafted the brand and style of J.Crew around her trademark style. She made J.Crew a tastemaker in the industry, though Lyons herself does not like to refer to herself as a tastemaker.

Part of this shift in branding was in their Style Guide. Lyons wanted it to have the feel of a fashion magazine, and the amount of editorial content increased drastically. This included a section entitled "Jenna's Picks" that looked at her opinions and revealed more about her everyday life. It also highlighted Lyons' personal clothing style, described by The New York Times as "geek-chic quirkiness, which mixed camouflage and sequins for day, and denim and taffeta for evening, all of it layered with big costume jewelry".

While this contributed to her fame, it also led to controversy when she was featured painting her then 3-year-old son's toenails hot pink. Though Beckett requested it to be done, some called this act "an attack on masculinity." Others, however, viewed it as a breaking from gender norms. Despite it gaining national attention, such as being featured on The Daily Show with Jon Stewart where it was labeled "Toemaggedon", both Lyons and J.Crew declined to comment.

Lyons' departure from J.Crew in 2017 was connected to declining sales and financial problems at the company. Her overarching role overseeing all aesthetic aspects of the brand (including store design and marketing) was not maintained, with the new chief design officer, Somsack Sikhounmuong, focusing more narrowly on women's, men's and children's clothing.

In October 2018, Lyons announced a partnership with Turner Entertainment for Stylish with Jenna Lyons, an unscripted reality show starring Lyons and her employees debuted December 3, 2020 on HBO Max. Additionally, in September 2020, Lyons launched LoveSeen, a beauty company with a focus on fake lashes, where she is presently the co-founder.

In October 2022, Lyons was announced as one of the seven stars of the rebooted 14th season of The Real Housewives of New York City, set to premiere in 2023.

Personal life
Lyons was married to artist Vincent Mazeau for nine years, with whom she had a son, Beckett. In 2011, the couple divorced and sold their townhome. 

In 2012, she publicly acknowledged her relationship with Courtney Crangi, and as of 2013 she was living in Tribeca with her son. Lyons and Crangi split up in December 2017.

Awards and accolades
Lyons won Glamour's 2012 Women of the Year award. She holds a position on the Council of Fashion Designers of America Board of Directors.

References

American fashion designers
American women fashion designers
Parsons School of Design alumni
Living people
Artists from Boston
American LGBT businesspeople
LGBT fashion designers
LGBT models
LGBT people from Massachusetts
People from Palos Verdes, California
1968 births
21st-century American women